The AFC Fifth Round of 2010 FIFA World Cup qualification was held on 5 and 9 September 2009 between the two teams that finished third in the fourth round. The order for the matches was decided by a random draw held on 2 June 2009 during the FIFA Congress in Nassau, the Bahamas.

The winning team advanced to a play-off against the winner of the OFC qualifying group, New Zealand. The winner of this play-off qualified for the 2010 World Cup finals.

The winner switched twice during the stoppage time in the second leg: before the stoppage time, the score was tied by 1-1 and therefore Bahrain had an advantage by away goals rule. In the first minute of the stoppage time, Saudi Arabia pulled the advantage to themselves by Hamad Al-Montashari. However, this was reversed again by Bahraini Ismael Abdullatif in the third minute of the stoppage time and Bahrain progressed on away goals.

AFC Fifth Round play-off 

2–2 on aggregate; Bahrain advanced on the away goals rule.

References

5
Qual
2009
2010
2009–10 in Saudi Arabian football
2009–10 in Bahraini football
September 2009 sports events in Asia